Hawkins Cirque is a cirque about  wide, in part occupied by a glacier, near the center of the south cliffs of Prentice Plateau, in the Olympus Range of Antarctica. The cirque opens south to Wright Upper Glacier. It was named by the Advisory Committee on Antarctic Names (2004) after Jack D. Hawkins, lead PHI helicopter pilot with the United States Antarctic Program in eight consecutive field seasons from 1996–97.

References

Cirques of Antarctica
Landforms of Victoria Land
McMurdo Dry Valleys